National Legal Aid Services Organization is a statutory organization of the Bangladesh government under the Ministry of Law, Justice and Parliamentary Affairs responsible for providing legal aid to poor Bangladeshis. Md. Aminul Islam is a district judge and the current director of the organization.

History
National Legal Aid Services Organization was established in 2000 based on bill for legal aid passed by the parliament of Bangladesh. In 2009, the Government of Bangladesh increased the power and functions of the organization.

References

2001 establishments in Bangladesh
Organisations based in Dhaka
Government agencies of Bangladesh
Government departments of Bangladesh